Borderland is a 1937 American Western film directed by Nate Watt and written by Harrison Jacobs. The film stars William Boyd, James Ellison, George "Gabby" Hayes, Morris Ankrum, John Beach, Nora Lane, and Charlene Wyatt. The film was released on February 26, 1937, by Paramount Pictures.

Plot
The Plot follows ranger Hoppy who goes undercover in an outlaw gang operating in the border, Hoppy has to find the head of the gang and dismantle it.

Cast  
William Boyd as Hopalong Cassidy
James Ellison as Johnny Nelson
George "Gabby" Hayes as Windy Halliday 
Morris Ankrum as Loco
John Beach as Texas Ranger Bailey
Nora Lane as Grace Rand
Charlene Wyatt as Molly Rand
Trevor Bardette as Colonel Gonzales
Earle Hodgins as Major Stafford 
Al Bridge as Henchman 'Dandy' Morgan
George Chesebro as Henchman Tom Parker 
John St. Polis as Doctor

References

External links 
 

1937 films
American Western (genre) films
1937 Western (genre) films
Paramount Pictures films
Films directed by Nate Watt
Hopalong Cassidy films
American black-and-white films
1930s English-language films
1930s American films